The Toronto Blue Jays are members of the American League (AL) East Division in Major League Baseball (MLB). There have been 14 different managers of the Blue Jays, the only Canadian baseball franchise in Major League Baseball. In baseball, the head coach of a team is called the manager (or more formally, the field manager). They are the only team outside the United States to win a World Series, and the first team to win a World Series in Canada. John Schneider is the was interim manager, until the club named him their full time manager in the off season and giving him a three year contract after, replacing Charlie Montoyo; Montoyo was fired on July 13, 2022.

Cito Gaston has both managed and won the most games of any Blue Jays manager, with 1,731 games and 894 wins. He is followed by John Gibbons in both categories, with 1,258 games and 644 wins, who surpassed Bobby Cox's marks during his second stint as manager. Gaston is the only Blue Jays manager to win a World Series in 1992 and 1993, the fourth African-American manager in MLB history, and was the first African-American manager to win a World Series. Cox is the only Blue Jays manager to be awarded the AL Manager of the Year Award in 1985. Mel Queen has the best winning percentage by winning 80 percent of his 5 games coached.

Overview

The first manager of the Blue Jays was Roy Hartsfield. While his tenure was marked by conflict between players and last place finishes, Hartsfield was supported by general manager Pat Gillick as they worked on the same long term management strategy: developing young players around which to build a team. Following the  season, the Blue Jays opted not to renew his contract but offered him a position within the organization, which he declined. Bobby Mattick served as manager on subsequent one-year contracts until Bobby Cox became available. As Mattick accepted an executive position in the Blue Jays organization, Cox signed a one-year contract, which was extended until the  season as he led the team out of last place for the first time, and into the playoffs in 1985. Shortly after Cox unexpectedly left the Blue Jays organization for the general manager position with the Atlanta Braves, third base coach Jimy Williams took over as manager. Gaston managed the team for nine seasons, including two World Series wins, though batting coach Gene Tenace did substitute for him for several weeks in  when Gaston was hospitalized with back pains. 

In , with the team in last place, Gaston was fired by general manager Gord Ash with 5 games remaining; pitching coach Mel Queen finished the season as manager. Ash, seeking a more aggressive management style, hired Tim Johnson for his breadth of experience and communication skills. When Rogers Communications acquired the Blue Jays organization, among other management changes, Fregosi was replaced with Buck Martinez. In June , as the team was struggling, new general manager J. P. Ricciardi fired Martinez and replaced him with third base coach Carlos Tosca. Tosca, and his successor John Gibbons, each managed the team for several seasons but both were fired mid-season as the team struggled: Tosca in August  replaced by first base coach Gibbons, and Gibbons in June  replaced by former manager Gaston. Following Gaston's retirement at the end of the 2010 season, former Boston Red Sox pitching coach, John Farrell was introduced as the new manager of the Toronto Blue Jays.

Key

Managers
Note: Statistics are correct as of the end of the 2021 Major League Baseball regular season.

Notes
A running total of the number of managers of the Blue Jays.  Thus, any manager who has two or more separate terms as manager is only counted once.
Gene Tenace managed until the end of the 1991 Toronto Blue Jays season as Gaston was sidelined with a herniated disc; Gaston returned in time for the playoffs.

References
General

Specific

Toronto Blue Jays
Managers